Right You Are (if you think so) (also translated as So It Is (If You Think So), is an Italian drama by Luigi Pirandello. The play is based on Pirandello's short story La signora Frola e il signor Ponza, suo genero.

It premiered 18 June 1917 in Milan. The theme is conflicting versions of the truth told by the main characters, each of whom claims the other is insane. Lady Frola claims that her son-in-law Mr. Ponza went insane when her daughter, his wife, died four years ago, then remarried. Lady Frola claims he fantasizes that his new wife is his old wife. Mr. Ponza claims that Lady Frola could not accept her daughter's death, went mad, and only survives by believing that his second wife is her living daughter. The townspeople attempt to learn the truth as the play progresses.

Characters 
 Lamberto Laudisi
 Lady Frola
 Mr. Ponza, her son-in-law
 Lady Ponza
 Councillor Agazzi
 Lady Amalia, his wife and sister of Lamberto Laudisi
 Dina, their daughter
 Lady Sirelli
 Mr. Sirelli
 The Prefect
 Commissioner Centuri
 Lady Cini
 Lady Nenni
 a waiter in the Agazzi's home
 other Ladies and Gentlemen

Plot 
Mr. Ponza and his mother-in-law, Mrs Frola, escape to a quiet provincial town after a terrible earthquake in Marsica. It is rumored Ponza is married, but no one has ever seen Mrs. Ponza. The Ponzas stay on the top floor on a nearby block, while Mrs Frola lives in a stylish apartment. The trio is the subject of many rumours. Townspeople see  Ponza as a monster who prevents his wife from leaving the house. So, Mr. Ponza's boss, Councillor Agazzi, goes the prefect to bring out the truth and clarify the matter. Lamberto Laudisi defends the newly arrived from the curiosity of the village, stating the impossibility of knowing each other and, more generally, absolute truth.

Mrs Frola becomes the object of a real investigation on the life of her family. Mr. Ponza is under the same investigation, during which he declares his mother-in-law insane. He explains Mrs Frola went insane after the death of her daughter Lina (his first wife), and he convinced Mrs Frola that Giulia (his second wife) is actually her daughter and is still alive. To preserve the illusion, they had to take a number of those precautions that made everyone suspicious.

The townspeople are stunned but reassured by the revelation. Mrs Frola soon learns of Ponza's story and claims he is crazy, at least in considering Giulia as his second wife. Mrs Frola says her daughter Lina Ponza had been in an asylum, and she would not have been accepted back at home without the second marriage, as if she were a second woman. Everyone is stunned, not knowing what to think, except Laudisi, who bursts into laughter. The search for evidence to determine the truth is actually the opportunity to Laudisi to unravel the meaning of this, while arguing with his own reflection in the mirror:
Oh dear! Who is insane among us? Oh I know, [pointing at himself] I say YOU! Who goes there, face to face, we know well the two of us. The trouble is that, like I do, others do not see you ... For others you become a ghost! And you see his as insane? Regardless of the ghosts who haunt them, they are running, full of curiosity, behind the ghosts of others!
In an attempt to solve the riddle, Councillor Agazzi arranges a meeting between mother-in-law and son-in-law: the resulting scenes are full of frenzied violence, in which Mr. Ponza screams at his mother-in-law. He later apologizes for his attitude, saying that it was necessary to play the part of the madman to keep alive the illusion of Mrs. Frola.

In the last act, after a vain search for evidence among the survivors of the earthquake, they seek out the first wife of Mr. Ponza at Agazzi asylum. They find a woman with her face covered by a black veil, who claims to be the daughter of Mrs. Frola and the second wife of Mr. Ponza. She says: "I am she, who one believes me  to be.". Laudisi, after a laugh, says with a look of mocking challenge: "And now, gentlemen, who speaks the truth? Are you happy?".

Translations into English 
 Right You Are! (If You Think So) by Arthur Livingston (E. P. Dutton & Co., 1922), later revised as It Is So! (If You Think So)
Right You Are by Eric Bentley (1954)
Right You Are (If You Think So) by Frederick May (1960)
Right You Are (If You Think You Are) by Bruce Penman (1987)
 So It Is (If You Think So) by Mark Musa (Penguin Books, 1996)
In 2003 Franco Zeffirelli commissioned a new translation/adaptation by Martin Sherman entitled Absolutely {Perhaps} and performed at Wyndham's Theatre in Dublin.

References

Sources 
 Baccolo, L. Luigi Pirandello. Milan: Bocca. 1949 (second edition).
 Di Pietro, A. Luigi Pirandello. Milan: Vita e Pensiero. 1950 (second edition).
 Ferrante, R. Luigi Pirandello. Firenze: Parenti. 1958.
 Gardair, J.-M.Pirandello e il suo doppio. Rome: Abete. 1977.
 Janner, A. Luigi Pirandello. Firenze: La Nuova Italia. 1948.
 Monti, M. Pirandello, Palermo: Palumbo. 1974.
 Moravia, A. "Pirandello" in Fiera Letteraria. Rome. December 12, 1946.
 Pancrazi, P. "L'altro Pirandello" in Scrittori Italiani del Novecento. Bari: Laterza. 1939.
 Pasini, F. Pirandello nell'arte e nella vita. Padova. 1937.
 Virdia, F. Pirandello. Milan: Mursia. 1975.

External links 
 
 The complete works of Pirandello in Italian and English section
 Presentation for Nobel Prize

1917 plays
Italian plays
Plays by Luigi Pirandello